Ian Enting (born 25 September 1948) is a mathematical physicist and the AMSI/MASCOS Professorial Fellow at the ARC Centre of Excellence for Mathematics and Statistics of Complex Systems (MASCOS) based at The University of Melbourne.

Enting is the author of Twisted, The Distorted Mathematics of Greenhouse Denial in which he analyses the presentation and use of data by climate change deniers.

More recently he has been addressing the claims made in Ian Plimer's book Heaven and Earth. He has published a critique, "Ian Plimer’s ‘Heaven + Earth’ — Checking the Claims", listing what Enting claims are numerous misrepresentations of the sources cited in the book.

From 1980 to 2004 he worked in CSIRO Atmospheric Research, primarily on modelling the global carbon cycle.

He was one of the lead authors of the chapter  and the Carbon Cycle in the 1994 IPCC report on Radiative Forcing of Climate.

Enting has published scientific papers, on mathematical physics and carbon cycle modelling, and a monograph on mathematical techniques for interpreting observations of carbon dioxide and other trace gases.

References

External links
 Ian Enting's homepage

1948 births
Living people
Australian climatologists
20th-century Australian mathematicians
21st-century Australian mathematicians
Intergovernmental Panel on Climate Change lead authors